This is a list of properties and districts in Hart County, Georgia that are listed on the National Register of Historic Places (NRHP).

Current listings

|}

References

Hart
Buildings and structures in Hart County, Georgia